Novruzlu or Nuruzly may refer to:
Novruzlu, Agdam, Azerbaijan
Novruzlu, Saatly, Azerbaijan